Roy Inman OBE was a British judoka, coach and author.

Biography
Roy Inman was born 30 April 1946 in Hounslow, London. He died on 30 May 2015, aged 69.

Judo career

Inman started Judo at the Budokwai in London in 1964. He was an international competitor for 12 years, winning two British Open titles, trained in Japan under Isao Okano and ran Fairholme Judo club for 30 years.

He was the British Judo Association National Coach for over 15 years and coached at 4 Olympic Games. Competitors that he coached in that time won 6 Olympic Medals and 14 World Championships. He was Head Coach, and Judo Technical Director for the University of Bath's High Performance Judo Program for 10 years.

Inman was Director of High Wycombe Judo Centre Ltd for over 20 years, and a Director of the British Judo Association Ltd and the British Judo Association Competitions and Events Ltd for over 6 years. Previously he was a member of the B.J.A Management Committee. Formerly Finance Director of a Hire Purchase Firm.

A prolific Coach Educator, he was a leading deliverer of the B.J.A Club Coach Award, and the architect of the B.J.A Instructor Award. He is a lecturer for the European Judo Union on their suite of Coach Awards, teaching on the E.J.U Level 4 Performance Coach Award at Anglia Ruskin University, Cambridge. Chairman of the B.J.A Coaching Commission since 2010, and Chair of the B.J.A Promotions Commission from 2008.

He served on the board of directors of the British Judo Association from 2001. He was named U.K. coach of the year in 1991, the O.B.E. from H.M. the Queen in 1992 and a Full Blue from the University of Bath in 2001.

The International Judo Federatuion awarded Inman the grade of 9th Dan in May 2013.

Books 
A selection of books written by Roy Inman include:

The Junior Promotion Syllabus 1981
The Kyu Grade Syllabus 1981
The Dan Grade Syllabus 1981
Judo For Women 1987
Contest Judo 1987
Olympic Judo 1990
The Skills of the Game 1995
The Judo Handbook 2005
The Ju Jitsu Handbook 2006
BJA Technical Grading Syllabus 2008

Awards 
Awarded O.B.E From Queen Elizabeth 
British Coach for 15 years
Awarded UK International Coach of the Year 1991
Author of 10 Books
Coached at 4 Olympic Games, Won 6 Olympic Medals And 14 World Championships
Awarded 9th Dan (By International Judo Federation)
Vice President of the B.J.A

References

British male judoka
Living people
1945 births
Officers of the Order of the British Empire
20th-century British people
21st-century British people